Sino-Japanese vocabulary, also known as  refers to Japanese vocabulary that originated in Chinese or was created from elements borrowed from Chinese. Some grammatical structures and sentence patterns can also be identified as Sino-Japanese.

Kango is one of three broad categories into which the Japanese vocabulary is divided. The others are native Japanese vocabulary (yamato kotoba) and borrowings from other, mainly Western languages (gairaigo). It has been estimated that about 60% of the words contained in modern Japanese dictionaries are kango,<ref>Shibatani, Masayoshi. [https://books.google.com/books?vid=ISBN0521369185&id=sD-MFTUiPYgC&pg=RA1-PA167&lpg=RA1-PA167&dq=%22Sino-Japanese%22+vocabulary&sig=v0OQy6QCTO_GkvVeFaNuQDf9ujQ#PRA1-PA142,M1 The Languages of Japan (Section 7.2 "Loan words", p.142)], Cambridge University Press, 1990. </ref> and that about 18–20% of words used in common speech are kango. The usage of such kango words also increases in formal or literary contexts, and in expressions of abstract or complex ideas.Kango, the use of Chinese-derived words in Japanese, is to be distinguished from kanbun, which is historical Literary Chinese written by Japanese in Japan. Both kango in modern Japanese and classical kanbun have Sino-xenic linguistic and phonetic elements also found in Korean and Vietnamese: that is, they are "Sino-foreign", meaning that they are not pure Chinese but have been mixed with the native languages of their respective nations. Such words invented in Japanese, often with novel meanings, are called wasei-kango. Many of them were created during the Meiji Restoration to translate non-Asian concepts and have been reborrowed into Chinese.Kango is also to be distinguished from gairaigo of Chinese origin, namely words borrowed from modern Chinese dialects, some of which may be occasionally spelled with Chinese characters or kanji just like kango. For example,  (Pekin, "Beijing") which was borrowed from a modern Chinese dialect, is not kango, whereas  (Hokkyō, "Northern Capital", a name for Kyoto), which was created with Chinese elements, is kango.

 Background 

Ancient China's enormous political and economic influence in the region had a deep effect on Japanese, Korean, Vietnamese and other Asian languages in East and Southeast Asia throughout history, in a manner somewhat similar to the preeminent position that Greek and Latin had in European history. At the time of their first contact, the existing Japanese language had no writing system, while the Chinese had a written language and a great deal of academic and scientific information, providing new concepts along with Chinese words to express them. Chinese became the language of science, learning, religion and government. The earliest written language to be used in Japan was literary Chinese, which has come to be called kanbun in this context. The kanbun writing system essentially required every literate Japanese to be competent in written Chinese, although it is unlikely that many Japanese people were then fluent in spoken Chinese. Chinese pronunciation was approximated in words borrowed from Chinese into Japanese; this Sino-Japanese vocabulary is still an important component of the Japanese language, and may be compared to words of Latin or Greek origin in English.

Chinese borrowings also significantly impacted Japanese phonology, leading to many new developments such as closed syllables (CV(N), not just CV) and length becoming a phonetic feature with the development of both long vowels and long consonants. (See Early Middle Japanese: Phonological developments for details.)

 Grammar 

Sino-Japanese words are almost exclusively nouns, of which many are verbal nouns or adjectival nouns, meaning that they can act as verbs or adjectives.

In Japanese, verbs and adjectives (that is, inflecting adjectives) are closed classes, and despite the large number of borrowings from Chinese, virtually none of these became inflecting verbs or adjectives, instead being conjugated periphrastically as above.

 Sino-Japanese and on'yomi 
On'yomi is also known as the 'Sino-Japanese reading', and is opposed to  under which Chinese characters are assigned to, and read as, native Japanese vocabulary.

However, there are cases where the distinction between on'yomi and kun'yomi does not correspond to etymological origin. Chinese characters created in Japan, called , normally only have kun'yomi, but some kokuji do have on'yomi. Similarly, the character  ("gland") has the on'yomi sen (from the on'yomi of its phonetic component,  sen "spring, fountain"), e.g. in  hentōsen "tonsils"; it was intentionally created as a kango and does not have a kun'yomi at all. Although not originating in Chinese, both of these are regarded as 'Sino-Japanese'.

By the same token, that a word is the kun'yomi of a kanji is not a guarantee that the word is native to Japanese. There are a few Japanese words that, although they appear to have originated in borrowings from Chinese, have such a long history in the Japanese language that they are regarded as native and are thus treated as kun'yomi, e.g.,  uma "horse" and  ume. These words are not regarded as belonging to the Sino-Japanese vocabulary.

 Words made in Japan 
 
While much Sino-Japanese vocabulary was borrowed from Chinese, a considerable amount was created by the Japanese themselves as they coined new words using Sino-Japanese forms.

Many Japanese-created kango refer to uniquely Japanese concepts.

Another miscellaneous group of words were coined from Japanese phrases or crossed over from kun'yomi to on'yomi. Examples include henji ( meaning 'reply', from native  kaerigoto 'reply'), rippuku ( 'become angry', based on  hara ga tatsu, literally 'belly/abdomen stands up'), shukka ( 'fire starts or breaks out', based on  hi ga deru), and ninja ( from  shinobi-no-mono meaning 'person of stealth'). In Chinese, the same combinations of characters are often meaningless or have a different meaning. Even a humble expression like gohan ( or  'cooked rice') is a pseudo-kango and not found in Chinese. One interesting example that gives itself away as a Japanese coinage is kaisatsu-guchi ( literally 'check ticket gate'), meaning the ticket barrier at a railway station.

Often they use corresponding morphemes to the original term, and thus qualify as calques. These terms include words for new technology, like  denwa ('telephone'), and words for Western cultural categories which the Sinosphere had no exact analogue of on account of partitioning the semantic fields in question differently, such as  kagaku ('science'),  shakai ('society'), and  tetsugaku ('philosophy'). Despite resistance from some contemporary Chinese intellectuals, many wasei kango were "back-borrowed" into Chinese around the turn of the 20th century. Such words from that time are thoroughly assimilated into the Chinese lexicon, but translations of foreign concepts between the two languages now occur independently of each other. These "back-borrowings" gave rise to Mandarin diànhuà (from denwa), kēxué (from kagaku), shèhuì (from shakai) and zhéxué (from tetsugaku). Since the sources for the wasei kango included ancient Chinese texts as well as contemporary English-Chinese dictionaries, some of the compounds—including  bunka ('culture', Mandarin wénhuà) and  kakumei ('revolution', Mandarin gémìng)—might have been independently coined by Chinese translators, had Japanese writers not coined them first. A similar process of reborrowing occurred in the modern Greek language, which took back words like τηλεγράφημα telegrafíma ('telegram') that were coined in English from Greek roots. Many of these words have also been borrowed into Korean and Vietnamese, forming (a modern Japanese) part of their Sino-Korean and Sino-Vietnamese vocabularies.

Alongside these translated terms, the foreign word may be directly borrowed as gairaigo. The resulting synonyms have varying use, usually with one or the other being more common. For example,  yakyū and  bēsubōru both translate as 'baseball', where the yakugo  is more common. By contrast,  teikyū and  tenisu both translate as 'tennis', where the gairaigo  is more common. Note that neither of these is a calque – they translate literally as 'field ball' and 'garden ball'. ('Base' is  rui, but  ruikyū is an uncommon term for 'softball', which itself is normally  sofutobōru).

Finally, quite a few words appear to be Sino-Japanese but are varied in origin, written with — kanji assigned without regard for etymology. In many cases, the characters were chosen only to indicate pronunciation. For example, sewa ('care, concern') is written , using the on'yomi "se" + "wa" ('household/society' + 'talk'); although this word is not Sino-Japanese but a native Japanese word believed to derive from sewashii, meaning 'busy' or 'troublesome'; the written form  is simply an attempt to assign plausible-looking characters pronounced "se" and "wa". Other ateji of this type include  mendō ('face' + 'fall down' = 'bother, trouble') and  yabo ('fields' + 'livelihood' = 'uncouth'). (The first gloss after each character roughly translates the kanji; the second is the meaning of the word in Japanese.)

 Phonetic correspondences between Modern Chinese and on'yomi 
At first glance, the on'yomi of many Sino-Japanese words do not resemble the Modern Standard Chinese pronunciations at all. Beyond this, there are two main reasons for the divergence between Modern Standard Chinese and Modern Standard Japanese pronunciations of cognate terms:
 Most Sino-Japanese words were borrowed in the 5th - 9th centuries AD, from Early Middle Chinese into Old Japanese. Both languages have changed significantly since then, and in different ways. This has resulted in the respective pronunciations becoming more and more divergent over time.
 Middle Chinese had a much more complex syllable structure than Old Japanese, as well as many more vowel and consonant differences.

Nonetheless, the correspondences between the two are fairly regular. As a result, Sino-Japanese can be viewed as a (transformed) "snapshot" of an archaic period of the Chinese language, and as a result is very important for comparative linguists as it provides a large amount of evidence for the reconstruction of Middle Chinese.

The following is a rough guide to equivalencies between modern Chinese words and modern Sino-Japanese on'yomi readings.

Unless otherwise noted, in the list below, sounds shown in quotation marks or italics indicate the usage of non-IPA romanization such as Hanyu pinyin for Mandarin Chinese and Hepburn romanization for Japanese.

 A major sound-shift has occurred in Mandarin since the time of modern contact with the West. Namely, the sounds written in Pinyin as "g"  or "k" , when immediately preceding an "i", "y" or "ü" sound, became "j" (similar to English "j") or "q" (similar to English "ch"). This change is called palatalization. As a result, Peking changed to Běijīng, and Chungking to Chóngqìng. This shift did not occur in Sino-Japanese. Thus, Mandarin qì ('breath, air, spirit') corresponds to Japanese ki. In some other varieties of Chinese, it is still pronounced as 'ki'. For example,  in Southern Min is khì (Pe̍h-ōe-jī romanization).
 Old Japanese did not have an "-ng" or  syllable ending, which is very common in Chinese. This sound was borrowed as either /i/ or /u/. The combinations /au/ and /eu/ later became "ō" and "yō", respectively, in Japanese. Thus, the Mandarin reading of "Tokyo" (Eastern Capital) is Dōngjīng; this corresponds to Japanese Tōkyō, with sound history for 京 being supposed approximately *kiæŋ -> kyau -> kyō (for comparison: Southern Min  (colloquial) is kiaⁿ with a nasal diphthong).
"kyō" (Go-on) vs. "kei" (Kan-on) vs. "kin" (Tō-on). These stem from multiple phases of borrowing, which occurred at different times and from different source dialects and were carried out by different groups of people possibly speaking different dialects of Japanese. This means that the same word may have had different Chinese pronunciations, and even if not, the borrowers may have chosen different strategies to handle unfamiliar sounds. For example, the character 京 seems to have had an approximate pronunciation of /kjæŋ/ at the time of both the Go-on (5th - 6th century AD) and Kan-on (7th - 9th century AD) borrowings; however, the unfamiliar vowel /æ/ was represented by /a/ in the former case and /e/ in the latter. (This may also indicate different source pronunciations of the vowel.) In addition, the unfamiliar final  was represented by /u/ in the former case but /i/ in the latter, agreeing in frontness vs. backness with the main vowel. By the time of the Tō-on borrowing (post-10th century), the pronunciation in Chinese had changed to /kiŋ/, thus the pronunciation "kin" was decided as the closest approximation.
 The vowels of Chinese sometimes correspond to Sino-Japanese in an apparently haphazard fashion.
 The distinction between voiced and unvoiced consonants ( vs.  or  vs. ) has been lost in modern Mandarin and many other varieties of Chinese. The key exception is in Wu dialects (e.g. Shanghainese). The Shanghainese voiced consonants match the Japanese  readings nearly perfectly in terms of voicing. For example,  (grape) is pronounced "budo" in Shanghainese and "budō" (< "budau") in Japanese (preserving the voiced consonants [b] and [d]), but "pútáo" in Mandarin. Incidentally, the rising tone of the Mandarin syllables may reflect the earlier voiced quality of the initial consonants.
 In modern Mandarin, all syllables end either in a vowel or in one of a small number of consonant sounds: "n", "ng", or occasionally "r". However, Middle Chinese, like several modern Chinese dialects (e.g. However, because Japanese phonology does not allow these consonants to appear at the end of a syllable either, they are usually followed in Sino-Japanese by an additional "i" or "u" vowel, resulting in a second syllable (-tsu or -chi if from -t, -ku or -ki if from -k, and -pu if from -p, although -pu became -fu and then simply -u). As a result, a one-syllable word in Chinese can become two syllables in Sino-Japanese. For example, Mandarin tiě ('iron') corresponds to Japanese . This is still pronounced with a final  in Cantonese:  (Vietnamese thiết). Another example is Mandarin guó ('land'), from Early Middle Chinese /kwək/, corresponding to Japanese koku.
The consonant "f" in Mandarin corresponds to both "h" and "b" in Japanese. Early Middle Chinese had no /f/, but instead had /pj/ or /bj/ (in other reconstructions,  or ). Japanese still reflects this ("h" was /p/ in Old Japanese). For example, Mandarin Fó ( 'Buddha') corresponds to Japanese ; both reflect Early Middle Chinese /bjut/ from a still older form /but/. In modern Southern Min Chinese, this character may be pronounced either [put] or [hut] (colloquial and literary respectively).
 In addition, as in the previous example, Old Japanese /p/ became modern "h". When a Middle Chinese word ended in /p/, this produced further complications in Japanese. For example, Middle Chinese  'ten' (Standard Mandarin "shí", Cantonese ) was borrowed as Old Japanese /zipu/. In time this went through a series of changes: /zipu/ > /zihu/ > /ziu/ >  > "jū". Note that in some compounds, the word was directly borrowed as /zip-/ > "jip-"; hence "jippun" 'ten minutes' (or "juppun", influenced by "jū"), rather than "*jūfun".
 More complex is the archaic dento-labial nasal sound: The character  ('strife, martial arts') was pronounced "mvu" in Late Middle Chinese. The sound is approximated in the Japanese pronunciations "bu" and "mu". However, that sound no longer exists in most modern Chinese dialects, except Southern Min "bú", and the character  is pronounced "wǔ" in Mandarin,  in Cantonese, "vu" in Hakka, Shanghainese, and Vietnamese.
 The modern Mandarin initial "r" usually corresponds to "ny" or "ni" in Japanese. (This distinction is still preserved in some Chinese varieties, such as Hakka and Shanghainese, as well as Vietnamese.) Thus Mandarin Rìběn (Japan) corresponds to Japanese Nippon. In Southern Min (especially Zhangzhou accent),  is "jîn" (literary pronunciation) which is practically identical to Japanese On'yomi.
 In Middle Chinese,  ('five') and similar characters were pronounced with a velar nasal consonant, "ng" ([ŋ]), as its initial. This is no longer true in modern Mandarin, but it remains the case in other Chinese dialects such as Cantonese and Shanghainese. Japanese approximates the Middle Chinese */ng/ with "g" or "go"; thus  becomes "go". In Southern Min, it is pronounced /gɔ/ (colloquial) or /ŋɔ/ (literary) while in the Fuzhou dialect it is pronounced "ngu". In addition, some Japanese dialects have [ŋ] for medial g.
 The Mandarin "hu" sound (as in "huá" or "huī") does not exist in Japanese and is usually omitted, whereas the Mandarin "l" sound becomes "r" in Japanese. Thus, Mandarin Huángbò corresponds to Japanese Ōbaku, and Rúlái and lamian (拉麵) to Nyorai and ramen respectively.
 Mandarin "h", usually from Middle Chinese  or  will often correspond to "k" or "g" in Japanese, as Old Japanese lacked velar fricatives: Modern Japanese  is derived from Old Japanese , which descended in most cases from a Proto-Japonic */p/; however, this lack of velar fricatives in Old Japanese helps preserve the voiced-voiceless contrast between Middle Chinese  and  that Mandarin, Cantonese, Korean and Vietnamese has lost. Mandarin "z" will often correspond to Japanese "j"; these are also changes in Chinese. Thus, Mandarin hànzì corresponds to Japanese kanji, hànwén (Chinese written language) to kanbun, and zuìhòu (最後 'last') to saigo''.

Chart of correspondences 
Note:
 MC: Middle Chinese
 Pinyin: Modern Standard Chinese (Mandarin) in its official spelling. Multiple outcomes for MC initials (e.g. MC /ɡ/ > Pinyin g,j,k,q) are primarily due to two reasons:
 MC voiced stops/affricates become Mandarin aspirated stops/affricates (p,t,k,etc.) when the syllable had the MC first tone (Mandarin first/second tones), unaspirated stops/affricates (b,d,g,etc.) otherwise.
 Early Mandarin velar obstruents (g,k,h) and alveolar sibilants (z,c,s) become palatal obstruents (j,q,x) when a front vowel or glide followed.
 Go: , from the Northern and Southern dynasties China or Baekje Korea during the 5th and 6th centuries. Go means Wu.
 Kan: , from the Tang dynasty during the 7th to 9th century.
 : Zen Buddhist borrowings from the Song dynasty (10th to 13th century) and after.

Initials:

Finals:

Later developments of diphthongs:
  →  → 
  → 
  → 
  → 
  →

Examples

Notes:
 Middle Chinese, Mandarin Pinyin, Go-on, Kan-on: See above.
 Middle Chinese reconstruction is according to William H. Baxter. His phonetic notation is used, along with IPA when different. Syllables are tone 1 unless otherwise indicated. See An Etymological Dictionary of Common Chinese Characters for more info.

See also 
Sino-Xenic pronunciations
List of Chinese–Japanese false friends
Wasei-kango
Wasei-eigo
Sino-Korean vocabulary
Singdarin
Classical compounds in European languages

Notes

References

Further reading

External links
 Analysis of regularity in Japanese phonetic series, with lists of most useful Kanji components for predicting on'yomi

Japanese phonology
Japanese vocabulary
Archaic Japanese language
Japanese